Commander Norman Douglas Holbrook VC (9 July 1888 – 3 July 1976) was a British naval recipient of the Victoria Cross (VC), the highest award of the British honours system. Holbrook was the first submariner to be awarded the VC and it was the first naval VC gazetted in the First World War.

Early life
Holbrook was born on 9 July 1888 in Southsea, Hampshire, fourth son of Colonel Sir Arthur Holbrook and his wife Amelia (nee Parks).  Sir Arthur was the proprietor of the Portsmouth Times, founder of the Southern Daily Mail and the Hilsea-based Holbrook Printers, a deputy Lord Lieutenant and later Conservative MP for Basingstoke.

He was educated privately and at Portsmouth Grammar School. In 1903, he enrolled in the officer training establishment Britannia Royal Naval College and was appointed midshipman on 9 January 1905. He joined the submarine depot ship  on 4 April 1911, served in submarines ,  and  before taking command of HMS B11 on 30 December 1913.

World War I
Holbrook was 26 years old, a lieutenant in the Royal Navy during the First World War when on 13 December 1914 at the Dardanelles, Turkey, he performed a deed for which he was awarded the Victoria Cross. He was in command of the submarine , an old and obsolete craft built in 1905. In spite of being attacked by gunfire and torpedo boats, Holbrook succeeded in bringing the B11 back to the Mediterranean, When they got back to safety the B11 had been submerged for nine hours.

Holbrook later achieved the rank of Commander.

Marriages
Holbrook married Viva Dixon, a widow, on 21 June 1919.  They had a son who was killed in action in the Second World War.  His wife died in 1952 and in the following year he married Austrian Gundula Bleichart (born 1914, died 2020).

Death and legacy
Holbrook died on 3 July 1976 at Midhurst, Sussex. He was buried at St James Old Churchyard, Stedham, West Sussex.  He is probably the only VC recipient to have a town and (until May 2004) a local government area named for him. On 24 August 1915, amid a wave of anti-German feeling related to the First World War, the name of the New South Wales Eastern Riverina town of Germanton was changed to Holbrook to honour the recent VC recipient. He subsequently visited the town on three occasions. His widow, Mrs. Gundula Holbrook, donated his medal to the Council of the Shire of Holbrook in 1982. In 1995 she made a substantial donation towards the establishment of a submariners' memorial in the town, and in 1997 visited the town to unveil it. A bronze statue of Holbrook stands in Germanton Park, Holbrook.

Holbrook's medal was donated to the Council of the Shire of Holbrook, New South Wales in 1982. It subsequently passed to Greater Hume Shire Council upon the amalgamation of several Riverina shires in May 2004. Holbrook's medal group, including his Victoria Cross, went on display at the Australian War Memorial on 11 December 2009. His medals are on loan from the Greater Hume Shire Council. A replica may be seen at the Submarine Museum, Holbrook.

Holbrook Road in Portsmouth is named after him.

A plaque was erected by the Submariners Association in 2014 on the exterior wall of the Portsmouth Grammar school Junior School facing Cambridge Junction, Portsmouth, UK.

References 

 Monuments to Courage (David Harvey, 1999)
 The Register of the Victoria Cross (This England, 1997)
 VCs of the First World War - 1914 (Gerald Gliddon, 1994)
 VCs of the First World War - The Naval VCs (Stephen Snelling, 2002)
   Includes biographical information.

External links
 Holbrook and Submarines - The Connection - online version of booklet published by The Submarine Museum on Holbrook and his act of gallantry. Includes list of crew members and copious other information.
 Submarine Town - Naval Historical Society of Australia page
 Musings on Holbrook (or Germanton) - Internet Family History Association of Australia page
 Location of grave and VC medal (West Sussex)
 Notes on the town and the several memorials with images
 ÇANAKKALE GEÇİLMEZ  page (in Turkish) about the action and the battleship sunk in the action (with images)
 Greater Hume Shire Council

1888 births
1976 deaths
Burials in Sussex
Military personnel from Portsmouth
People from Southsea
British Gallipoli campaign recipients of the Victoria Cross
Royal Navy officers
Royal Navy submarine commanders
Graduates of Britannia Royal Naval College
Royal Navy recipients of the Victoria Cross
Royal Navy officers of World War I
Royal Navy officers of World War II
Recipients of the Legion of Honour